Nile Green is Professor of History and the current holder of the Ibn Khaldun Endowed Chair in World History at the University of California, Los Angeles (UCLA). He specializes in Islamic history of Asia, the Middle East, Africa and Europe, including that of the wider Persianate world. He has authored seven monographs and over seventy articles and has edited seven books. He was a founding director of UCLA's Program on Central Asia, in addition to various boards, including the International Journal of Middle East Studies. According to his profile page, Green currently functions as a member of the South Asia Council of the Association of Asian Studies, the Executive Committee of the American Institute of Afghanistan Studies, in addition to being a member of the editorial boards of Iranian Studies, Iran-Nameh, Afghanistan, the Journal of South Asian Intellectual History and the South Asia Across the Disciplines book series.

References

American historians of Islam
Middle Eastern studies scholars
Central Asian studies scholars
Indologists
Pakistan studies scholars
University of California, Los Angeles faculty
Living people
Year of birth missing (living people)
Historians from California